The 1985–86 Michigan Wolverines men's basketball team represented the University of Michigan in intercollegiate college basketball during the 1985–86 season. The team played its home games in the Crisler Arena in Ann Arbor, Michigan, and was a member of the Big Ten Conference.  Under the direction of head coach Bill Frieder, the team repeated as the Big Ten Conference Champion.  The team earned the number two seed in the 1986 NCAA Division I men's basketball tournament where it advanced one round before losing. The team began the season ranked number three and ended the season ranked number five after peaking at number two in the Associated Press Top Twenty Poll.  It was ranked in all seventeen weeks, and it also ended the season ranked number five in the final UPI Coaches' Poll. Butch Wade and Roy Tarpley served as team captains and Tarpley earned team MVP.

On December 7, 1985, the team set the current Big Ten Conference single-game record for team blocked shots with 18 against , and Tarpley led the conference with a 2.50 blocked shot average in conference games for the season.  The team repeated as scoring margin statistical champion with a 10.6 average in conference games.  Additionally, the team led the conference in rebounding average (35.1), rebounding margin (5.8), steals (8.61) and block shots (3.94).

For the second of five consecutive seasons, the team set the school record for single-season field goal percentage with a 51.6% (1049-for-2032) performance. The team also set a school single-season free throw percentage record of 74.8% that would be eclipsed the following season, surpassing the 74.4% set in 1975. Gary Grant's single-season total of 185 assists established a school record that he would surpass two seasons later. It surpassed Antoine Joubert's 164 total set in 1985. His single-season steals total of 84 and average of 2.55 surpassed Ricky Green's 1977 school records, but Grant would better each of these statistics the following year. The team set the school single-season total steals record of 265 that stood until 1994, surpassing the 1977 total of 263. Roy Tarpley surpassed his school single-season blocked shots average record of 2.20 set the prior season with an average of 2.94. He broke his two-year-old single-season total record of 69 with a total of 97. Both records still stand . He also set the career blocks average of 2.06 that remained unsurpassed until Chris Webber averaged 2.50 during his career that ended in 1993. His career total of 251 remains unsurpassed. On December 7, 1985, against , Tarpley totaled 10 blocks in a game break his own school single-game record of 7 set the prior year. That night the team totaled 18 blocks. Both numbers are current school records. For the season, the team posted 146 blocks which stood as a school record until 1992. Richard Rellford ended his career with 124 games played, which surpassed Steve Grote's 1977 record of 116. Antoine Joubert would surpass the record the following season. On January 5, 1985, the team began a 24-game home winning streak against Ohio State that continued through a February 15, 1986, victory over Iowa. This stands as the longest home winning streak in school history. The streak ended with a February 20, 1986 74–59 loss to Michigan State. This stands as the longest road winning streak in school history.

In the 64-team NCAA Division I men's basketball tournament, number two seeded Michigan advanced one round by defeating the Akron Zips 70–64. In the second round the team was upset by seven-seeded Iowa State 72–69.

Rankings

Team players drafted into the NBA
Seven players from this team were selected in the NBA Draft.

See also
 NCAA men's Division I tournament bids by school
 NCAA men's Division I tournament bids by school and conference
 NCAA Division I men's basketball tournament all-time team records

References

Michigan
Michigan Wolverines men's basketball seasons
Michigan
Michigan Wolve
Michigan Wolve